Stratford is a town located on the Connecticut River in Coös County, New Hampshire, United States. The population was 662 at the 2020 census, down from 746 at the 2010 census. Within the town are the villages of North Stratford, Stratford Hollow, and Beatties. U.S. Route 3 passes through the center of town, as does the St. Lawrence and Atlantic Railroad, formerly a part of the Grand Trunk Railway.

Stratford is part of the Berlin, NH–VT Micropolitan Statistical Area.

The Janice Peaslee Bridge connects Stratford to Maidstone, Vermont.

History 
Originally granted in 1762 with the name "Woodbury", the town was regranted as Stratford in 1773.

Geography

Demographics

At the 2000 census there were 942 people, 397 households, and 235 families living in the town.  The population density was 11.8 people per square mile (4.6/km).  There were 540 housing units at an average density of 6.8 per square mile (2.6/km).  The racial makeup of the town was 95.75% White, 1.27% Native American, 0.11% from other races, and 2.87% from two or more races. Hispanic or Latino of any race were 0.74%.

Of the 397 households 26.7% had children under the age of 18 living with them, 42.6% were married couples living together, 12.1% had a female householder with no husband present, and 40.8% were non-families. 32.0% of households were one person and 10.8% were one person aged 65 or older.  The average household size was 2.37 and the average family size was 3.03.

The age distribution was 23.8% under the age of 18, 9.0% from 18 to 24, 24.3% from 25 to 44, 30.1% from 45 to 64, and 12.7% 65 or older.  The median age was 40 years. For every 100 females, there were 85.8 males.  For every 100 females age 18 and over, there were 88.5 males.

The median household income was $28,594 and the median family income  was $33,295. Males had a median income of $29,375 versus $21,488 for females. The per capita income for the town was $13,783.  About 10.7% of families and 14.3% of the population were below the poverty line, including 18.5% of those under age 18 and 8.9% of those age 65 or over.

Notable people
 Mary R. Platt Hatch (1848–1935), author

See also

 New Hampshire Historical Marker No. 34: Log Drives

References

External links
 
 New Hampshire Economic and Labor Market Information Bureau Profile

Towns in Coös County, New Hampshire
Berlin, New Hampshire micropolitan area
New Hampshire populated places on the Connecticut River
Towns in New Hampshire